

MPEG Multichannel is an extension to the MPEG-1 Layer II audio compression specification, as defined in the MPEG-2 Audio standard (ISO/IEC 13818-3) which allows it provide up to 5.1-channels (surround sound) of audio. To maintain backwards compatibility with the older 2-channel (stereo) audio specification, it uses a channel matrixing scheme, where the additional channels are mixed into the two backwards compatible channels. Extra information in the data stream (ignored by older hardware) contains signals to process extra channels from the matrix.

It was originally a mandatory part of the DVD specification for European DVDs, but was dropped in late 1997, and is rarely used as a result.

The Super Video CD (SVCD) standard supports MPEG Multichannel. Player support for this audio format is nearly non-existent however, and it is rarely used.

MPEG Multichannel audio was proposed for use in the ATSC digital TV broadcasting standard, but Dolby Digital (aka. AC-3, A/52) was chosen instead. This is a matter of significant controversy, as it has been revealed that the organizations (The Massachusetts Institute of Technology and Zenith Electronics) behind 2 of the 4 voting board members received tens of millions of dollars of compensation from secret deals with Dolby Laboratories in exchange for their votes.

MPEG Multichannel–compatible equipment would bear either the MPEG Multichannel or MPEG Empowered logos.

See also 
MPEG-1
MPEG-2
Super Video CD
DVD
TooLAME

References

External links
 MPiG a website critical of MPEG Multichannel
 mctooLAME: An Open Source MPEG Multichannel audio encoder and decoder
 Official MPEG web site
 web site

MPEG-2
Audio codecs